Billy Flynn (born August 11, 1956) is an American Chicago blues and electric blues guitarist, singer and songwriter.

In addition to his own work and works mentioned later, he has worked and recorded with Bryan Lee, Little Smokey Smothers, Mark Hummel, Willie Kent, Snooky Pryor, Big Bill Morganfield, John Brim, Jody Williams, Little Arthur Duncan, Deitra Farr, and Billy Boy Arnold.

Biography
Flynn was born in Green Bay, Wisconsin. In 1970, a local blues club opened and Flynn was inspired by the music provided there by Luther Allison, Johnny Littlejohn and Mighty Joe Young.  Flynn was fortunate to be spotted playing outside the venue by Jimmy Dawkins, who arranged for Flynn to play with him on stage. Flynn joined Dawkins's backing band in 1975, and he played and toured with them until the end of the decade.

Flynn also worked locally during this period and played alongside Sunnyland Slim. In the early part of the 1980s, Flynn was a member of the touring ensemble Jim Liban and the Futuramics. In the late 1980s, he joined the Legendary Blues Band. He also played with Mississippi Heat.

Willie "Big Eyes" Smith's 2008 album, Born in Arkansas, utilized Flynn, plus bassist Bob Stroger, pianist Barrelhouse Chuck, Little Frank Krakowski and Smith's son, drummer Kenny "Beedy Eyes" Smith.

In August 2010, Flynn and Kid Ramos backed Kim Wilson at the Edmonton's Labatt Blues Festival.

Discography

Solo albums

See also
List of blues mandolinists
List of Chicago blues musicians
List of electric blues musicians

References

External links
Official website

1956 births
Living people
American blues singers
American male singers
American blues guitarists
American male guitarists
Chicago blues musicians
Electric blues musicians
American blues mandolinists
Singers from Wisconsin
Songwriters from Wisconsin
Musicians from Green Bay, Wisconsin
Songwriters from Illinois
Guitarists from Illinois
Guitarists from Wisconsin
20th-century American guitarists
20th-century American male musicians
American male songwriters
The Legendary Blues Band members